Aktion Gitter was a "mass arrest action" by the Gestapo which took place in Germany between 22 and 23 August 1944.   It came just over a month after the failed attempt to assassinate the country's leader, Adolf Hitler, on 20 July 1944. The programme targeted former officials and members of mainstream centre and left-wing "Bourgeois" parties from the period of democratic government that were declared illegal after January 1933.   Those arrested included Social Democrats and trades unionists, Liberals, Communists and Bavarian People's Party members, along with members of the old centre parties.

The name
Aktion Gitter was the official title used by the government, but these events are also sometimes identified in sources as Aktion Gewitter or Aktion Himmler.   "Gewitter" is a German word for a "thunder storm" and Heinrich Himmler was a senior member of the government whose areas of responsibility included policing and a wide range of other matters administered in his capacity as Minister of the Interior.

The word "Gitter" can be translated into English as "grille" or "lattice":  in the context of Aktion Gitter it refers to putting people "behind bars". The term had already been officially used before, in connection with a mass arrest overnight of more than 4,000 people that had taken place in the Protectorate of Bohemia and Moravia on 16 March 1939, in connection with completion of the German takeover in what had previously been the western part Czechoslovakia.

Planning
The mass arrests of Aktion Gitter were neither unprecedented nor a spontaneous government response to the assassination attempt of July 1944, but the working through of long-standing policies.   Leading politicians from the Weimar years had been identified on a so-called government "A-list" as early as 1935/36, divided into sub-categories A-1, A-2 and A-3.   At the outbreak of the Second World War in 1939 the Gestapo had arrested between 2,000 and 4,000 people whose names appeared on List A-1.   These were identified as "enemies of the state" and placed in "protective custody", in most cases in the Buchenwald concentration camp.   However, most of these had been released by the summer of 1940.   Nevertheless, Hitler gave notice in April 1942 that "if a mutiny were to break out today somewhere in the country", it would meet with an immediate response ("Sofortmaßnahmen").   Directly following the outbreak of civil arrest or similar disturbances, all leading men from the [left-wing] opposition, and indeed also those from the Catholic political tradition would be arrested, removed from their homes and sent for execution.   Additionally all concentration camp inmates would be shot along with all criminals, whether they were in state detention or at liberty at the time.

On 14 August 1944 SS Chief Heinrich Himmler received the mandate to have former Social Democratic (SPD) and Communist Party (KPD) officials detained.   The mass arrest, which was estimated to cover more than 5,000 former politicians, should take no account of whether or not those detained were still engaged in opposition activity, and was not connected with the search underway for the July assassination plotters.   On Thursday 17 August 1944 all leading Gestapo officers in the country received a secret telex from Department 4 of the Reich Security Main Office (Reichssicherheitshauptamt; RSHA).   The telex contained notification from Gestapo Chief Heinrich Müller, regional Landtags or city councils who had been members of the (till 1933 legal) SPD and KPD (parties) along with all trades union and party officials of the SPD, without regard to whether or not they were currently facing investigation, were to be detained.   Those aged more than 70, those who were ill and those who had been "of service to the system" [since 1933] should be spared from arrest, however.   The arrests were to happen nationwide during the early hours of 22 August.   Orders were that detainees should then be taken without delay to the nearest concentration camp and taken into what was designated "protective custody" by the RHSA.   Additionally, by 25 August Gestapo officers of the RHSA should then report the total numbers arrested, analysed according to political party and according to political functions.   Himmler's orders arrived under the heading Aktion Gitter.   On 21 August the order was extended so that pre-1933 assembly members from the old Centre Party were also to be detained, although this broadening of the scope of The Aktion was partially rescinded two days later.

Implementation
The arrests went ahead as instructed, in the small hours, either by Gestapo officers acting alone or by Gestapo officers acting in partnership with local police officers.   Estimates indicate that approximately 5,000 were arrested across Germany, and most were promptly delivered to the closest concentration camp.   Some of the concentration camps receiving the largest numbers of "Aktion Gitter" detainees were at Neuengamme near Hamburg (650), Buchenwald near Weimar (742) and Dachau near Munich (860).   In Berlin detainees were taken to the main Gestapo prison in Prince Albrecht Street, and a large number from this area were also sent to Ravensbrück.   The arrests had in many cases been undertaken on the basis of out of date lists:  many of those arrested were old and ill, and had not been involved in politics for more than ten years.   Some of those arrested had already been arrested during the immediate aftermath of the Nazi takeover in 1933, but subsequently released.   Others found themselves arrested for the first time.   Many were released after a few months in response to protests from family members.

Victims
The way in which the mass arrests were carried out triggered such popular resentment that one week later on 30 August 1944, Ernst Kaltenbrunner ordered a review that led to some mitigation.   Overall the approach of the ruling Nazi Party remained inconsistent and unpredictable, however.   On the one hand many of the detainees were soon released in response to massive protests from their families and friends.   But on the other hand, because of the inhuman conditions in the concentration camps during the winter of 1944/45, many of those who remained in detention died.   That is what happened to Johanna Tesch and Joseph Roth.   Former  national Reichstag Gitter detainees who did not survive the concentration camps included , Karl Mache and Heinrich Jasper.   The Hamburg education reformer Kurt Adams was a Gitter victim who possibly did not even live to experience that year's winter.  As the end of the war approached the authorities evacuated concentration camps in areas about to be over-run by enemy armies.   Evacuation was accomplished through a succession of forced marches, which came to be known as death marches.   Camp inmates unable to complete these death marches were simply shot.   Other Gitter detainees perished when the SS Cap Arcona, by then used as a prison ship and moored off Lübeck, was sunk by the British Royal Air Force the day before the German military surrender.   Aktion Gitter was therefore a government reprisal that ended in death for many of those caught up in it.

Politician victims of Aktion  Gitter who survived the experience and re-emerged as national politicians in the German Federal Republic (West Germany), following its establishment in 1949, include Konrad Adenauer (CDU), Paul Löbe (SPD) and Kurt Schumacher (SPD).

There is a longer list of Aktion Gitter victims, currently (September 2015) of 192 lines, on German Wikipedia at 'Victims of Aktion Gitter (1944)'.

Historiography
The historian Stefanie Schüler-Springorum, writing in 2005, noted that Aktion Gitter had at that time only been researched "selectively" for northern Germany.  Subsequently other historians have endorsed the view that Aktion Gitter has not yet been conclusively researched.

Further reading
 Christl Wickert: Widerstand und Verfolgung deutscher Sozialdemokratinnen und Sozialdemokraten im 20. Jahrhundert. In: Vorstand der Sozialdemokratischen Partei Deutschlands (Hrsg.): Der Freiheit verpflichtet. Gedenkbuch der deutschen Sozialdemokratie im 20. Jahrhundert. With a foreword by Gerhard Schröder. Schüren, Marburg 2000, p. 363–402.
 Bauche, Brüdigam, Eiber, Wiedey: Widerstand in Hamburg 1939–1945. In: Arbeit und Vernichtung. Das Konzentrationslager Neuengamme 1938–1945. Katalog zur ständigen Ausstellung im Dokumentenhaus. VSA-Verlag, Hamburg 1991, p. 48.
 Joachim Fest: Staatsstreich. Der lange Weg zum 20. Juli. btb-verlag, Berlin 2004, .
 Gedenkstätte Buchenwald (Hrsg.): Aktion "Gitter" ("Gewitter"). In: Konzentrationslager Buchenwald 1937–1945. Begleitband zur ständigen historischen Ausstellung. Wallstein Verlag, Göttingen 2005, p. 168–169.
 Gedenkstätte Dachau (Hrsg.): Deutsche Regimegegner der "Aktion Gewitter". In: Konzentrationslager Dachau 1933 bis 1945. Text- und Bilddokumente zur Ausstellung, mit CD. Comité Internationale de Dachau, 2005, p. 162.

References

Government of Nazi Germany
Reich Security Main Office
Gestapo